Bonnie (originally titled The Bonnie Hunt Show) is an American sitcom television series that aired on CBS from September 22, 1995 to April 21, 1996. Bonnie Hunt played Bonnie Kelly, a television reporter who moves from Wisconsin to take a job with a local TV station in Chicago. There she encounters an eclectic group of coworkers.

In addition to the stories surrounding her personal life and her life at the station, each episode showed one of Bonnie's television news features, where she would interview real people who were attending (or otherwise involved in) current real local events. These scenes were improvised.

Cast
Bonnie Hunt as Bonnie Kelly
Mark Derwin as Bill Kirkland
Brian Howe as Sammy Sinatra
Don Lake as Keith Jedzik
Tom Virtue as Tom Vandoozer
Holly Wortell as Holly Janovsky

Production notes
The series premiered as The Bonnie Hunt Show in September 1995, and aired under that title for the first 6 episodes before being put on hiatus in November. Upon returning to the air in March, the show was retitled Bonnie, and ran for an additional 5 episodes to improved ratings but it was not enough to prevent cancellation. A further two episodes were produced, but never broadcast.

As with Hunt's previous short-run 1993 sitcom The Building, The Bonnie Hunt Show had a theatrical sensibility wherein minor mistakes, accidents, and forgotten lines were often left in the aired episode.  As well, cast members Hunt, Lake, Virtue and Wortell had all starred in The Building—which like this show was set in Chicago, produced by David Letterman's Worldwide Pants production company, and directed by John Bowab. Hunt created the show with Rob Burnett, and wrote most of the episodes.

Hunt's next sitcom, Life With Bonnie, would also feature Hunt, Derwin and Wortell; it once again focused on a news reporter in Chicago, but aired on ABC. Virtue had a recurring role in Life With Bonnie, but was not a regular. Don Lake would co-create that show with Hunt, and appear in a number of bit roles. John Bowab was also a frequent Life With Bonnie director.

Episodes

References
 

1990s American sitcoms
1995 American television series debuts
1996 American television series endings
CBS original programming
Television shows set in Chicago
Television series by Worldwide Pants
Television series by CBS Studios